Tsagaan-Üür is a sum of Khövsgöl aimag. The area is 8,730 km2, of which only 1,140 km2 are pasture. In 2000, Tsagaan-Üür had a population of 2,421 people, including Khalkha, Uriankhai, and Buriad. The sum center, officially named Bulgan, is located on the banks of the Üür River, 173 km north-east of Mörön and 844 km from Ulaanbaatar.

History 

The Tsagaan-Üür sum was founded, together with the whole Khövsgöl aimag, in 1931. In 1933, it had 2,400 inhabitants in 690 households, and about 22,000 head of livestock. The local negdel, first named Uilgan and later Tsog, was founded in 1939.

Economy 

In 2004, there were about 22,000 head of livestock, among them 3,400 goats, 3,900 sheep, 11,300 cattle and yaks, and 3,400 horses, but no camels.

Miscellanea 

About 35 km east of the sum center is a cave known as Dayan deerkhiin agui. Tsagaan-Üür, especially the Uilgan River valley, is famous for its wrestlers.

References

Literature 

M. Nyamaa, Khövsgöl aimgiin lavlakh toli, Ulaanbaatar 2001, p. 195f

Districts of Khövsgöl Province